The 2015–16 Tennessee State Tigers basketball team represented Tennessee State University during the 2015–16 NCAA Division I men's basketball season. The Tigers, led by second year head coach Dana Ford, played their home games at the Gentry Complex and were members of the East Division of the Ohio Valley Conference. They finished the season 20–11, 11–5 in OVC play to finish in a three-way tie for second place in the East Division. They lost in the quarterfinals of the OVC tournament to Austin Peay. They were invited to the CollegeInsider.com Tournament where they lost in the first round to Ball State.

Roster

Schedule

|-
!colspan=9 style="background:#; color:#FFFFFF;"| Exhibition

|-
!colspan=9 style="background:#; color:#FFFFFF;"| Regular season

|-
!colspan=9 style="background:#; color:#FFFFFF;"| Ohio Valley Conference regular season

|-
!colspan=9 style="background:#; color:#FFFFFF;"|Ohio Valley Conference tournament

|-
!colspan=9 style="background:#; color:#FFFFFF;"|CIT

References

Tennessee State Tigers basketball seasons
Tennessee State
Tennessee State